Thomas Earp (1830 – 17 February 1910) was an English Liberal Party politician who sat in the House of Commons from 1874 to 1885.

Earp was the son of William Earp of Derby and his wife Sarah Taylor, daughter of James Taylor of Muskham. He was educated at the Diocesan School in Derby and became a partner in the firms of Gilstrap, Earp & Co. maltsters and Richardson Earp and Slater, brewers. He was a town councillor for Newark-upon-Trent and was Mayor of the borough from 1869 to 1870.

At the 1874 general election Earp was elected as a Member of Parliament (MP) for the borough of Newark. He was re-elected in 1880, and held the seat until the parliamentary borough was abolished at the 1885 general election, when he stood unsuccessfully in the new single-seat Newark division of Nottinghamshire.

Earp died at the age of 79.

Earp married Martha Weightman, daughter of T Weightman of Langford Nottinghamshire, in 1855.

References

External links

1830 births
1910 deaths
UK MPs 1880–1885
UK MPs 1874–1880
Councillors in Nottinghamshire
Mayors of places in Nottinghamshire
Liberal Party (UK) MPs for English constituencies